The 2009 Claxton Shield was the 56th edition of the premier baseball competition in Australia, contested between teams representing the five mainland states: New South Wales Patriots, Queensland Rams, defending champions Perth Heat (representing the state of Western Australia), South Australia and Victoria Aces. During each series of the season, teams nominated a 19–player roster of active players. Only players on the active roster could participate in a game.

New South Wales Patriots

Perth Heat

Queensland Rams

Roster Updates
In:
Steven Greer
Ryan Searle
Tristian Crawford
Out:
Luke White
Jacob Rooke
John Veitch

South Australia

Victoria Aces

External links
Official Baseball Australia Website
Official 2009 Claxton Shield Showcase Rosters

Roster